The 1988 National Camogie League is a competition in the women's team field sport of camogie was won by Kilkenny, who defeated Dublin in the final, played at O'Toole Park. Dublin were defeated finalists for the fifth year in succession. It was the last National League to be played under the shorter (1934–89) match duration of 50 minutes.

Arrangements
Dublin were missing Ann Colgan through a damaged knee, and Patricia Clinton and Carmel O'Byrne had gone to the USA for the summer. Marie O'Connell was involved in examinations and Una Crowley was unavailable.

The Final
Angela Downey contributed 2-5 of Kilkenny’s total of 3-10 in the final. Highlight of the match was one solo run by Angela Downey when she weaved her way around four Dublin defenders before scoring a goal. It enabled Kilkenny to lead 1-5 to 1-4 at half-time. The deciding factor in the first half was the midfield domination of Kilkenny’s Deirdre Malone, Anna Wheland and Marina Downey. Angela Downey scored three minutes after the restart, and it was the highlight of fifteen minutes of constant Kilkenny pressure. A goal from Louise Lynch after 42 minutes gave Dublin confidence but Kiklkenny regained their composure and Breda Holmes scored a match-clinching goal three minutes later.

Dublin’s League Record
Remarkably it was Dublin’s fifth successive defeat in a National Camogie League final and their eighth final appearance in ten years. At the time, Dublin’s scheduling of the county championship for earlier in the year than most of their competitors was assumed to give them an advantage in the National League.

Division 2
The Junior National League, known since 2006 as Division Two, was won by Armagh captained by Denise McStay, who defeated Down in the final on July 3.

Final stages

References

External links
 Camogie Association

National Camogie League
1988